The name Roy has been used to name three tropical cyclones in the Western Pacific Ocean.

 Tropical Storm Roy (1981) (Miling) – churned over the South China Sea.
 Tropical Storm Roy (1984) – a weak tropical storm that affected the Mariana Islands.
 Typhoon Roy (1988) (T8801, 01W, Asiang) – the second-most intense January Pacific typhoon on record; caused widespread damage on Guam and on Rota in the Mariana Islands.

The name Roy was retired following the 1988 typhoon season and was replaced with Ryan.

Pacific typhoon set index articles